Estradiol cyclooctyl acetate (E2COA), or estradiol 17β-cyclooctylacetate, also known as estra-1,3,5(10)-triene-3,17β-diol 17β-cyclooctylacetate, is an estrogen medication and an estrogen ester – specifically, the 17β-cyclooctylacetate ester of estradiol – which has been studied for use in hormone replacement therapy for ovariectomized women and as a hormonal contraceptive in combination with a progestin but was never marketed. It has greater oral bioavailability than does micronized estradiol due to absorption via the lymphatic system and hence partial bypassing of first-pass metabolism. It is approximately twice as potent as micronized estradiol orally and has a comparatively reduced impact on liver parameters such as changes in sex hormone-binding globulin production. It was investigated in combination with desogestrel as a birth control pill, but resulted in unacceptable menstrual bleeding patterns and was not further developed.

See also
 List of estrogen esters § Estradiol esters

References

Abandoned drugs
Acetate esters
Estradiol esters
Synthetic estrogens